The 2019–20 USHL season was the 41st season of the United States Hockey League as an all-junior league. The regular season ran from September 26, 2019, to March 12, 2020.

At the end of the previous season, the Central Illinois Flying Aces ceased operations dropping the league to 16 teams.

On March 12, 2020, the USHL Board of Directors announced the unanimous decision to suspend play due to the ongoing COVID-19 pandemic. On March 18, 2020, the league cancelled the remainder of the regular season and 2020 Clark Cup playoffs, citing concerns for the health and safety of players and team personnel. On April 1, 2020, the Chicago Steel were named the regular season champions and awarded the Anderson Cup for accumulating 83 points in 49 games.

Regular season
Final standings:

Eastern Conference

Western Conference

x = clinched playoff berth; y = clinched conference title; z = clinched regular season title

Post season awards

USHL awards

All-USHL First Team

Source

All-USHL Second Team

Source

All-Rookie First Team

All-Rookie Second Team

References

External links
 Official website of the United States Hockey League

United States Hockey League seasons
USHL